Maryvonne is a French feminine given name. It is a portmanteau of Mary and Yvonne. 
The correct pronunciation is 
Mari or Marie vonne. 
It is not pronounced Mary. 
It is a Breton name from the Britanny (Bretagne) region which is in north west France.

List of people with the given name 
Maryvonne Pinault (née Campbell). Wife of Francois Pinault  the French businessman. Their son François-Henri Pinault is married to  the Mexican American actress.Salma Hayek
 Maryvonne Blondin (born 1947), French politician
 Maryvonne Briot (born 1959), French politician

 Maryvonne Dupureur (1937–2008), French middle-distance runner
 Maryvonne de Saint-Pulgent (born 1951), French musicologist
 Maryvonne Huet (born 1936) is a former French figure skater
 Maryvonne Kendergi (1915–2011), Canadian-Armenian writer, professor and musicologist
 Maryvonne Mühlbauer (1992-present), Dutch Comedian

See also 

 Marrevone dialect

French feminine given names